Domes built in the 19th, 20th, and 21st centuries benefited from more efficient techniques for producing iron and steel as well as advances in structural analysis. 

Metal-framed domes of the 19th century often imitated earlier masonry dome designs in a variety of styles, especially in church architecture, but were also used to create glass domes over shopping arcades and hothouses, domes over locomotive sheds and exhibition halls, and domes larger than any others in the world. The variety of domed buildings, such as parliaments and capitol buildings, gasometers, observatories, libraries, and churches, were enabled by the use of reinforced concrete ribs, lightweight papier-mâché, and triangulated framing.

In the 20th century, planetarium domes spurred the invention by  Walther Bauersfeld of both thin shells of reinforced concrete and geodesic domes. The use of steel, computers, and finite element analysis enabled yet larger spans. Tension membrane structure became popular for domed sports stadiums, which also innovated with rigid retractable domed roofs.

Nineteenth century

Developments

Materials
New production techniques allowed for cast iron and wrought iron to be produced both in larger quantities and at relatively low prices during the Industrial Revolution. Most iron domes were built with curved iron ribs arranged radially from the top of the dome to a ring at the base. The material of choice for domes changed over the course of the 19th century from cast iron to wrought iron to steel. Excluding domes that simply imitated multi-shell masonry, the century's chief development of the simple domed form may be metal framed domes such as the circular dome of Halle au Blé in Paris and the elliptical dome of Royal Albert Hall in London. 

The practice of building rotating domes for housing large telescopes became popular in the 19th century, with early examples using papier-mâché to minimize weight. 

Beginning in the late 19th century, the Guastavino family, a father and son team who worked on the eastern seaboard of the United States, further developed the masonry dome. They perfected a traditional Spanish and Italian technique for light, center-less vaulting using layers of tiles in fast-setting cement set flat against the surface of the curve, rather than perpendicular to it. The father, Rafael Guastavino, innovated with the use of Portland cement as the mortar, rather than the traditional lime and gypsum mortars, which allowed mild steel bar to be used to counteract tension forces.

Although domes made entirely from reinforced concrete were not built before 1900, the church of Saint-Jean-de-Montmartre was designed by Anatole de Baudot with a small brick shell dome with reinforced concrete ribs.

Structure
Proportional rules for an arch's thickness to span ratio were developed during the 19th century, based on catenary shape changes in response to weight loads, and these were applied to the vertical forces in domes. Edmund Beckett Denison, who had published a proof on the subject in 1871, wrote in a Domes article in the Ninth Edition of the Encyclopædia Britannica that the thickness to span ratio was lower for a dome than it was for an arch due to the more distributed loads of a dome. Ideas on linear elasticity were formalized in the 19th century.

The span of the ancient Pantheon dome, although matched during the Renaissance, remained the largest in the world until the middle of the 19th century. The large domes of the 19th century included exhibition buildings and functional structures such as gasometers and locomotive sheds.

Domes made of radial trusses were analyzed with a "plane frame" approach, rather than considering three dimensions, until an 1863 Berlin gasometer dome design by engineer Johann Wilhelm Schwedler that became known as the "Schwedler dome". He published the theory behind five such domes and a structural calculation technique in 1866. Schwedler's work on these axially symmetric shells was expanded by August Föppl in 1892 to apply to "other shell-type truss frameworks". By the 1860s and 1870s, German and other European engineers began to treat iron domes as collections of short straight beams with hinged ends, resulting in light openwork structures. Other than in glasshouses, these structures were usually hidden behind ceilings. Dome types that used lengths of rolled steel with riveted joints included "Schwedler domes", "Zimmermann domes", "lattice domes", and "Schlink domes".

According to Irene Giustina, dome construction was one of the most challenging architectural problems until at least the end of the 19th century, due to a lack of knowledge about statics. Rafael Guastavino's use of the recent development of graphic statics enabled him to design and build inexpensive funicular domes with minimal thickness and no scaffolding. The vaults were typically 3 inches thick and workers, standing on the completed portions, used simple templates, wires, and strings to align their work.

Style
The historicism of the 19th century led to many domes being re-translations of the great domes of the past, rather than further stylistic developments, especially in sacred architecture. The Neoclassical style popular at this time was challenged in the middle of the 19th century by a Gothic Revival in architecture, in what has been termed the "Battle of the Styles". This lasted from about 1840 to the beginning of the 20th century, with various styles within Classicism, such as Renaissance, Baroque, and Rococo revivals, also vying for popularity. The last three decades of this period included unusual combinations of these styles.

Religious and royal buildings

Iron domes offered the lightness of timber construction along with incombustibility and higher strength, allowing for larger spans. Because domes themselves were relatively rare, the first examples made from iron date well after iron began to be used as a structural material. Iron was used in place of wood where fire resistance was a priority. In Russia, which had large supplies of iron, some of the earliest examples of the material's architectural use can be found. Andrey Voronikhin built a large wrought iron dome over Kazan Cathedral in Saint Petersburg. Built between 1806 and 1811, the 17.7 meter wide outer dome of the cathedral was one of the earliest iron domes. The iron outer dome covers two masonry inner domes and is made of 15 mm thick sheets set end to end.

An early example from Britain is within the fanciful iron-framed dome over the central building of the Royal Pavilion in Brighton, begun in 1815 by John Nash, the personal architect of King George IV. The dome was not one of the prominent onion domes but instead the dome-like structure of twelve cast iron ribs resting on cast iron columns over Henry Holland's earlier saloon. It was completed in 1818-1819.

The neoclassical Baltimore Basilica, designed by Benjamin Henry Latrobe like the Roman Pantheon for Bishop John Carroll, was begun in 1806 and dedicated in 1821, although the porch and towers would not be completed until the 1870s. An influence on the interior design may have been the Church of St. Mary in East Lulworth, England, where Bishop Carroll had been consecrated. The central dome is 72 feet in diameter and 52 feet above the nave floor. The onion domes over the two towers were built according to Latrobe's designs. The church was extended to the east by 33 feet in 1890. Before initial construction of the church was completed, two other neoclassical domed churches would be built in Baltimore. The First Independent (Unitarian) Church by Maximilian Godefroy was begun in 1817 and covered the interior space with a 55 foot wide shallow coffered dome on pendentives with an oculus at the center. To improve acoustics, the interior was modified. The First Baptist Church by Robert Mills, also known as "Old Red Top Church", was a domed cylindrical rotunda with a porch block and portico. The dome had a shallow exterior profile and its oculus was covered by a low lantern, called a monitor. It was completed in 1818 but demolished in 1878.

In 1828, the eastern crossing tower of Mainz Cathedral was rebuilt by Georg Moller with a wrought iron dome. The dome was made of flat iron sections and reinforced with ties that passed through the interior of the dome. Such dome reinforcement was one of the two established techniques, the other being the use of a combination of horizontal rings and vertical ribs. The span may have been about 27 meters. It was later removed in favor of the current structure.

The Altes Museum in Berlin, built in 1828 by Karl Schinkel, included a dome in its entrance hall inspired by the Roman Pantheon.

Large neoclassical domes include the Rotunda of Mosta in Malta, was completed in 1840 with a dome 38 meters wide, and San Carlo al Corso in Milan, completed in 1847 with a dome 32 meters wide.

Saint Isaac's Cathedral, in Saint Petersburg, was built by 1842 with one of the largest domes in Europe. A cast iron dome nearly 26 meters wide, it had a technically advanced triple-shell design with iron trusses reminiscent of St. Paul's Cathedral in London. The design for the cathedral was begun after the defeat of Napoleon in 1815 and given to a French architect, but construction was delayed. Although the dome was originally designed to be masonry, cast iron was used instead.

Also reminiscent of St. Paul's dome and that of the Panthéon in Paris, both of which the original designer had visited, the dome of St. Nicholas' Church in Potsdam was added to the building from 1843-49. A dome was included as a possibility in the original late Neoclassical design of 1830, but as a wooden construction. Iron was used instead by the later architects.

Other examples of framed iron domes include those of a synagogue in Berlin, by Schwedler in 1863, and the Bode Museum by Muller-Breslau in 1907.

The wrought-iron dome of Royal Albert Hall in London was built from 1867 to 1871 over an elliptical plan by architect Henry Young Darracott Scott and structural design by Rowland Mason Ordish. It uses a set of curved trusses, like those of the earlier New Street Station in Birmingham, interrupted in the middle by a drum. The elliptical dome's span is 66.9 meters by 56.5 meters.

The wrought-iron dome of St. Augustin's church in Paris dates from 1870 and spans 25.2 meters. A wrought-iron dome was also built over Jerusalem's Holy Sepulchre in 1870, spanning 23 meters.

The dome over the Basilica of San Gaudenzio (begun in 1577) in Novara, Italy, was built between 1844 and 1880. Revisions by the architect during construction transformed what was initially going to be a drum, hemispherical dome, and lantern 42.22 meters tall into a structure with two superimposed drums, an ogival dome, and a thirty meter tall spire reaching 117.5 meters. The architect, Alessandro Antonelli, who also built the Mole Antonelliana in Turin, Italy, combined Neoclassical forms with the vertical emphasis of the Gothic style. 

A large dome was built in 1881–1882 over the circular courtyard of the Devonshire Royal Hospital in England with a diameter of 156 feet. It used radial trussed ribs with no diagonal ties.

The dome of Pavia Cathedral, a building started in 1488, was completed with a large octagonal dome joined to the basilica plan of the church.

Commercial buildings
Although iron production in France lagged behind Britain, the government was eager to foster the development of its domestic iron industry. In 1808, the government of Napoleon approved a plan to replace the burnt down wooden dome of the Halle au Blé granary in Paris with a dome of iron and glass, the "earliest example of metal with glass in a dome". The dome was 37 meters in diameter and used 51 cast iron ribs to converge on a wrought iron compression ring 11 meters wide containing a glass and wrought iron skylight. The outer surface of the dome was covered with copper, with additional windows cut near the dome's base to admit more light during an 1838 modification. Cast-iron domes were particularly popular in France.

In the United States, an 1815 commission to build the Baltimore Exchange and Custom House was awarded to Benjamin Henry Latrobe and Maximilian Godefroy for their design featuring a prominent central dome. The dome design was altered during construction to raise its height to 115 feet by adding a tall drum and work was completed in 1822. Signals from an observatory on Federal Hill were received at an observation post in the dome, providing early notice of arriving merchant vessels. The building was demolished in 1901-2.

The Coal Exchange in London, by James Bunning from 1847-1849, included a dome 18 meters wide made from 32 iron ribs cast as single pieces. It was demolished in the early 1960s.

Large temporary domes were built in 1862 for London's International Exhibition Building, spanning 48.8 meters. The Leeds Corn Exchange, built in 1862 by Cuthbert Brodrick, features an elliptical plan dome 38.9 meters by 26.7 meters with wrought iron ribs along the long axis that radiate from the ends and others spanning the short axis that run parallel to each other, forming a grid pattern.

Elaborate covered shopping arcades, such as the Galleria Vittorio Emanuele II in Milan and the Galleria Umberto I in Naples, included large glazed domes at their cross intersections.  The dome of the Galleria Vittorio Emanuele II (1863–1867) rises to 145 feet above the ground and has the same span as the dome of St. Peter's Basilica, with sixteen iron ribs over an octagonal space at the intersection of two covered streets. It is named after the first king of a united Italy.

The central market hall in Leipzig was built by 1891 with the first application of the "lattice dome" roof system developed by August Föppl from 1883. The dome covered an irregular pentagonal plan and was about 20 meters wide and 6.8 meters high.

Vladimir Shukhov was an early pioneer of what would later be called gridshell structures and in 1897 he employed them in domed exhibit pavilions at the All-Russia Industrial and Art Exhibition.

The dome of Sydney's Queen Victoria Building uses radial ribs of steel along with redundant diagonal bracing to span 20 meters. It was claimed to be the largest dome in the Southern Hemisphere when completed in 1898.

Greenhouses and conservatories
Iron and glass glasshouses with curved roofs were popular for a few decades beginning shortly before 1820 to maximize orthogonality to the sun's rays, although only a few have domes. The conservatory at Syon Park was one of the earliest and included a 10.8 meter span iron and glass dome by Charles Fowler built between 1820 and 1827. The glass panes are set in panels joined by copper or brass ribs between the 23 main cast iron ribs. Another example was the conservatory at Bretton Hall in Yorkshire, completed in 1827 but demolished in 1832 upon the death of the owner. It had a 16 meter wide central dome of thin wrought iron ribs and narrow glass panes on a cast iron ring and iron columns. The glass acted as lateral support for the iron ribs.

The Antheum at Brighton would have had the largest span dome in the world in 1833 at 50 meters but the circular cast-iron dome collapsed when the scaffolding was removed.

Unique glass domes springing straight from ground level were used for hothouses and winter gardens, such as the Palm house at Kew (1844–48) and the Laeken winter garden near Brussels (1875–1876). The Laeken dome spans the central 40 meters of the circular building, resting on a ring of columns. The Kibble Palace of 1865 was re-erected in 1873 in an enlarged form with a 16 meter wide central dome on columns. The Palm House at Sefton Park in Liverpool has an octagonal central dome, also 16 meters wide and on columns, completed in 1896.

Libraries
The domed rotunda building of the University of Virginia was designed by Thomas Jefferson and completed in 1836.

The British Museum Library constructed a new reading room in the courtyard of its museum building between 1854 and 1857. The round room, about 42.6 meters in diameter and inspired by the Pantheon, was surmounted by a dome with a ring of windows at the base and an oculus at the top. Hidden iron framing supported a suspended ceiling made of papier-mâché. A cast iron dome was built between 1860 and 1867 over the reading room of the Bibliothèque nationale in Paris. 

Inspired by the prestigious British Museum reading room, the first iron dome in Canada was built in the early 1870s over the reading room of the Library of Parliament building in Ottawa. Unlike the British Museum room, the library, which opened in 1876, uses the Gothic style. 

The dome of the Thomas Jefferson Building of the Library of Congress, also inspired by the reading room dome at the British Museum, was built between 1889 and 1897 in a classical style. It is 100 feet wide and rises 195 feet above the floor on eight piers. The dome has a relatively low external profile to avoid overshadowing the nearby United States Capitol dome.

The Boston Public Library (1887-1898) includes dome vaulting by Rafael Guastavino.

Governmental buildings

The design for the United States' national capitol building approved by George Washington included a dome modeled on the Pantheon, with a low exterior elevation. Subsequent design revisions resulted in a double dome, with a raised external profile on an octagonal drum, and construction did not begin until 1822. The interior dome was built of stone and brick except for the upper third, which was made of wood. The exterior dome was wooden and covered with copper sheeting. The dome and building were completed by Charles Bulfinch in 1829.

Most of the 50 state capitol buildings or statehouses with domes in the United States cover a central rotunda, or hall of the people, due to the use of a bicameral legislature. The Pennsylvania capitol building designed by Stephen Hills in Harrisburg was the earliest to combine all the elements that would subsequently become characteristic of state capitol buildings: dome, rotunda, portico, and two legislative chambers. Like the design of the national capitol, the design was chosen through a formal competition. Early domed state capitol buildings include those of North Carolina (as remodeled by William Nichols), Alabama (in Tuscaloosa), Mississippi, Maine (1832), Kentucky, Connecticut (in New Haven), Indiana, North Carolina (as rebuilt), Missouri (very similar to Hills' Harrisburg design), Minnesota (later rebuilt), Texas, and Vermont (1832).

The current dome over the United States Capitol building, although painted white and crowning a masonry building, is made of cast iron. The dome was built between 1855 and 1866, replacing a lower wooden dome with copper roofing from 1824. It has a 30-meter diameter. It was completed just two years after the Old St. Louis County Courthouse, which has the first cast iron dome built in the United States. The initial design of the capitol dome was influenced by a number of European church domes, particularly St. Paul's in London, St. Peter's in Rome, the Panthéon in Paris, Les Invalides in Paris, and St. Isaac's Cathedral in St. Petersburg. The architect, Thomas U. Walter, designed a double dome interior based on that of the Panthéon in Paris. 

Dome construction for state capitol buildings and county courthouses in the United States flourished in the period between the American Civil War and World War I. Most capitols built between 1864 and 1893 were landmarks for their cities and had gilded domes. Examples from the Gilded Age include those of California, Kansas, Connecticut, Colorado, Idaho, Indiana, Iowa, Wyoming, Michigan, Texas, and Georgia. Many American state capitol building domes were built in the late 19th or early 20th century in the American Renaissance style and cover rotundas open to the public as commemorative spaces. Examples include the Indiana State House, Texas State Capitol, and the Wisconsin State Capitol. American Renaissance capitols also include those of Rhode Island and Minnesota.

The Reichstag Palace, built between 1883 and 1893 to house the Parliament of the new German Empire, included a dome made of iron and glass as part of its unusual mixture of Renaissance and Baroque components. Controversially, the 74 meter tall dome stood seven meters taller than the dome of the Imperial Palace in the city, drawing criticism from Kaiser Wilhelm II. Hermann Zimmermann assisted the architect Paul Wallot in 1889, inventing the spatial framework for the dome over the plenary chamber. It is known as the "Zimmermann dome".

The Hungarian Parliament Building was built in the Gothic style, although most of the 1882 design competition entries used Neo-Renaissance, and it includes a domed central hall. The large, ribbed, egg-shaped dome topped with a spire was influenced by the dome of the Maria vom Siege church in Vienna. It has a sixteen sided outer shell with an iron skeleton that rises 96 meters high, and an inner shell star vault supported on sixteen stone pillars. The Dome Hall is used to display the coronation crown of Hungary and statuary of monarchs and statesmen. The dome was structurally complete by the end of 1895.

Industrial buildings
The "first fully triangulated framed dome" was built in Berlin in 1863 by Johann Wilhelm Schwedler in a gasometer for the Imperial Continental Gas Association and, by the start of the 20th century, similarly triangulated frame domes had become fairly common. Schwedler built three wrought-iron domes over gasholders in Berlin between 1876 and 1882 with spans of 54.9 meters, one of which survives. Six similar Schwedler-type domes were used over gasholders in Leipzig beginning in 1885 and in Vienna using steel, in the 1890s. Rather than using traditional iron ribs, the domes consist of a thinner arrangement of short straight iron bars connected with pin joints in a lattice shell, with cross-bracing provided by light iron rods.

Tombs
The dome of Grant's Tomb in New York City was built by Rafael Guastavino in 1890.

Twentieth century

Developments
American state capitol domes built in the twentieth century include those of Arizona, Mississippi, Pennsylvania, Wisconsin, Idaho, Kentucky, Utah, Washington, Missouri, and West Virginia. The West Virginia capitol building has been called the last American Renaissance capitol.

Wooden domes in thin-wall shells on ribs were made until the 1930s. After World War II, steel and wooden laminate structural members made with waterproof resorcinol glues were used to create domes with grid-patterned wooden support structures, such as the 100 meter diameter Skydome in Flagstaff, Arizona.

Stand-alone dome structures were used to house public utility facilities in the 20th century. The "Fitzpatrick dome", designed by John Fitzpatrick as an inexpensive structure to store winter road service sand and salt, has been used in countries around the world. The first was built in 1968. The domes have twenty sides and are normally 100 feet in diameter and a little more than 50 feet tall. The conical shape is meant to conform to the 45 degree slope of a pile of wet sand. They are built on concrete footings and covered with asphalt shingles.

Guastavino tile
The Guastavino family, a father and son team who worked on the eastern seaboard of the United States, built vaults using layers of tiles in hundreds of buildings in the late 19th and early 20th centuries, including the domes of the Basilica of St. Lawrence in Asheville, North Carolina, and St. Francis de Sales Roman Catholic Church in Philadelphia, Pennsylvania. The dome over the crossing of the Cathedral of St. John the Divine in New York City was built by the son in 1909. A part-spherical dome, it measures 30 meters in diameter from the top of its merging pendentives, where steel rods embedded in concrete act as a restraining ring. With an average thickness 1/250th of its span, and steel rods also embedded within the pendentives, the dome "looked forward to modern shell construction in reinforced concrete."

Steel and concrete

Domes built with steel and concrete were able to achieve very large spans. The West Baden Springs Hotel in Indiana was built in 1903 with the largest span dome in the world at 200 feet. Its metal and glass skin was supported by steel trusses resting on metal rollers to allow for expansion and contraction from temperature changes. It was surpassed in span by the Centennial Hall of Max Berg.

The 1911 dome of the Melbourne Public Library reading room, presumably inspired by the British Museum, had a diameter of 31.5 meters and was briefly the widest reinforced concrete dome in the world until the completion of the Centennial Hall. The Centennial Hall was built with reinforced concrete in Breslau, Germany (today Poland), from 1911–13 to commemorate the 100-year anniversary of the uprising against Napoleon. With a 213 foot wide central dome surrounded by stepped rings of vertical windows, it was the largest building of its kind in the world. Other examples of ribbed domes made entirely of reinforced concrete include the Methodist Hall in Westminster, London, the Augsburg Synagogue, and the Orpheum Theater in Bochum. The 1928 Leipzig Market Hall by Deschinger and Ritter featured two 82 meter wide domes.

The thin domical shell was further developed with the construction of two domes in Jena, Germany in the early 1920s. To build a rigid planetarium dome, Walther Bauersfeld constructed a triangulated frame of light steel bars and mesh with a domed formwork suspended below it. By spraying a thin layer of concrete onto both the formwork and the frame, he created a 16 meter wide dome that was just 30 millimeters thick. The second dome was still thinner at 40 meters wide and 60 millimeters thick. These are generally taken to be the first modern architectural thin shells. These are also considered the first geodesic domes. Beginning with one for the Deutsches Museum in Munich, 15 domed projection planetariums using concrete shells up to 30 meters wide had been built in Europe by 1930, and that year the Adler Planetarium in Chicago became the first planetarium to open in the Western Hemisphere. Planetarium domes required a hemispherical surface for their projections, but most 20th century shell domes were shallow to reduce the material costs, simplify construction, and reduce the volume of air needing to be heated.

In India, the Viceroy's House in New Delhi was designed in 1912-1913 by Edwin Lutyens with a dome.

Although an equation for the bending theory of a thick spherical shell had been published in 1912, based on general equations from 1888, it was too complex for practical design work. A simplified and more approximate theory for domes was published in 1926 in Berlin. The theory was tested using sheet metal models with the conclusion that the membrane stresses in domes are small with little reinforcement required, especially at the top, where openings could be cut for light. Only the concentrated stresses at point supports required heavy reinforcement. Early examples used a relatively thick bordering girder to stabilize exposed edges. Alternative stabilization techniques include adding a bend at these edges to stiffen them or increasing the thickness of the shell itself at the edges and near the supports. In 1933–34, Spanish engineer-architect Eduardo Torroja, with Manuel Sanchez, designed the Market Hall in Algeciras, Spain, with a thin shell concrete dome. The shallow dome is 48 meters wide, 9 centimeters thick, and supported at points around its perimeter. The indoor stadium for the 1936 Olympic Games in Berlin used an oval dome of concrete shell 35 meters wide and 45 meters long. 

The use of metal structures in Italy was reduced in the first half of the 20th century by autarchy and the demands of the world wars. Steel became broadly used in building construction in the 1930s. A shortage of steel following World War II and the demonstrated vulnerability of exposed steel to damage from intense fires during the war may have contributed to the popularity of concrete architectural shells beginning in the late 1940s. In the 1960s, improvements in welding and bolting techniques and higher labor costs made steel frames more economical.

Popularized by a 1955 article on the work of Félix Candela in Mexico, architectural shells had their heyday in the 1950s and 1960s, peaking in popularity shortly before the widespread adoption of computers and the finite element method of structural analysis. Notable examples of domes include the Kresge Auditorium at MIT, which has a spherical shell 49 meters wide and 89 millimeters thick, and the Palazzetto dello Sport, with a 59 meter wide dome designed by Pier Luigi Nervi. 

Built from 1955 to 1957, the prestressed concrete dome of the main exhibition hall of the Belgrade Fair has a span of 106 meters. It was designed by Branko Žeželj, using a pre-stressing system developed by him, and was the largest dome in the world until 1965. It remains the largest dome in Europe.

Reticular and geodesic domes

Structurally, geodesic domes are also considered shells when the loads are borne by the surface polygons, as in the Kaiser Dome, but are considered space grid structures when the loads are borne by point-to-point members. A geodesic dome made of welded steel tubes was made in 1935 for the aviary of the Rome Zoo. Aluminum reticular domes allow for large dimensions and short building times, suitable for sports arenas, exhibition centers, auditoriums, or storage facilities. The Dome of Discovery exhibition hall was built in London in 1951. It was the largest domed building in the world at the time, 365 feet wide. Other aluminum domes include the 61 meter wide "Palasport" in Paris (1959) and the 125 meter wide "Spruce Goose Dome" in Long Beach, California.

Although the first examples were built 25 years earlier by Walther Bauersfeld, the term "geodesic domes" was coined by Buckminster Fuller, who received a patent for them in 1954. Geodesic domes have been used for radar enclosures, greenhouses, housing, and weather stations. Early examples in the United States include a 53-foot-wide dome for the Ford Rotunda in 1953 and a 384-foot-diameter dome for the Baton Rouge facility of the Union Tank Car Company in 1958, the largest clear-span structure in the world at that time. The U.S. Pavilion at Expo 67 in Montreal, Quebec, Canada, was enclosed by a 76.5-meter-wide and 60-meter-tall dome made of steel pipes and acrylic panels. It is used today as a water monitoring center. Other examples include the Amundsen-Scott South Pole Station, which was used from 1975 to 2003, and the Eden Project in the UK, built in 2000.

Tension and membranes

Tensegrity domes, patented by Buckminster Fuller in 1962 from a concept by Kenneth Snelson, are membrane structures consisting of radial trusses made from steel cables under tension with vertical steel pipes spreading the cables into the truss form. They have been made circular, elliptical, and other shapes to cover stadiums from Korea to Florida. While the first permanent air supported membrane domes were the radar domes designed and built by Walter Bird after World War II, the temporary membrane structure designed by David Geiger to cover the United States pavilion at Expo '70 was a landmark construction. Geiger's solution to a 90% reduction in the budget for the pavilion project was a "low profile cable-restrained, air-supported roof employing a superelliptical perimeter compression ring". Its very low cost led to the development of permanent versions using teflon-coated fiberglass and within 15 years the majority of the domed stadiums around the world used this system, including the Silverdome in Pontiac, Michigan. The restraining cables of such domes are laid diagonally to avoid the sagging perimeter found to occur with a standard grid.

Tension membrane design has depended upon computers, and the increasing availability of powerful computers resulted in many developments being made in the last three decades of the 20th century. Weather-related deflations of some air-supported roofs led David Geiger to develop a modified type, the more rigid "Cabledome", that incorporated Fuller's ideas of tensegrity and aspension rather than being air-supported. The pleated effect seen in some of these domes is the result of lower radial cables stretching between those forming trusses in order to keep the membrane in tension. The lightweight membrane system used consists of four layers: waterproof fiberglass on the outside, insulation, a vapor barrier, then an acoustic insulation layer. This is semitransparent enough to fulfill most daytime lighting needs beneath the dome. The first large span examples were two Seoul, South Korea, sports arenas built in 1986 for the Olympics, one 93 meters wide and the other 120 meters wide. The Georgia Dome, built in 1992 on an oval plan, uses instead a triangulated pattern in a system patented as the "Tenstar Dome". In Japan, the Izumo Dome was built in 1992 with a height of 49 meters and a diameter of 143 meters. It uses a PTFE-coated glass fiber fabric. The first cable dome to use rigid steel frame panels as roofing instead of a translucent membrane was begun for an athletic center in North Carolina in 1994. The Millennium Dome was completed as the largest cable dome in the world with a diameter of 320 meters and uses a different system of membrane support, with cables extending down from the 12 masts that penetrate the membrane.

Retractable domes and stadiums

The higher expense of rigid large span domes made them relatively rare, although rigidly moving panels is the most popular system for sports stadiums with retractable roofing. With a span of 126 meters, Pittsburgh's Civic Arena featured the largest retractable dome in the world when completed for the city's Civic Light Opera in 1961. Six of its eight sections could rotate behind the other two within three minutes, and in 1967 it became the home of the Pittsburgh Penguins hockey team.

The Assembly Hall arena at the University of Illinois Urbana-Champaign was completed in 1963 with a concrete saucer dome spanning 400 feet. The edge of the dome was post-tensioned with more than 600 miles of steel cable. The first domed baseball stadium, the Astrodome in Houston, Texas, was completed in 1965 with a rigid 641 foot wide steel dome filled with 4,596 skylights. Other early examples of rigid stadium domes include the steel frame Superdome of New Orleans and the cement Kingdome of Seattle. The Louisiana Superdome has a span of 207 meters. Stockholm's 1989 Ericsson Globe, an arena for ice hockey, earned the title of largest hemispherical building in the world with a diameter of 110 meters and height of 85 meters.

Montreal's Olympic Stadium featured a retractable membrane roof in 1988, although repeated tearing led to its replacement with a non-retractable roof. The SkyDome of Toronto opened in 1989 with a rigid system in four parts: one that is fixed, two that slide horizontally, and one that rotates along the edge of the 213 meter wide span. In Japan, the 1993 Fukuoka Dome featured a 222-meter dome in three parts, two of which rotated under the third.

Twenty-first century

The variety of modern domes over sports stadiums, exhibition halls, and auditoriums have been enabled by developments in materials such as steel, reinforced concrete and plastics. Their uses over department stores and "futuristic video-hologram entertainment centres" exploit a variety of non-traditional materials. The use of design processes that integrate numerical control machines, computer design, virtual reconstructions, and industrial prefabrication allow for the creation of dome forms with complex geometry, such as the 2004 ellipsoid bubbles of Nardini Company's production district designed by Massimiliano Fuksas.

Ōita Stadium was built in 2001 as a mostly fixed semi-spherical roof 274 meters wide with two large membrane-covered panels that can slide down from the center to opposite sides. Singapore's National Stadium was completed in 2014 with the largest dome in the world at 310 meters in span. It uses a post-tensioned concrete ring beam to support steel trusses that enable two halves of a section of the dome to retract.

References

Bibliography

 
 
 
 
 
 
 
 
 
 
 
 
 
 
 
 
 
 
 
 
 
 
 
 
 
 
 
 
 
 
 
 
 
 
 
 
 
 
 
 
 
 
 
 
 
 
 
 
 
 
 
 
 
 
 
 
 
 
 
 
 
 
 
 
 
 
 

Domes
Arches and vaults
Architectural elements
Church architecture
Mosque architecture
Baroque architectural features
Ceilings
Roofs